Single Black Female is a 2022 American thriller television film directed by Shari L. Carpenter and written by Sa'Rah Jones and Tessa Evelyn Scott. Starring Amber Riley, Raven Goodwin, and K. Michelle, it is inspired by the 1992 film Single White Female. The film was released on February 5, 2022, and was the most viewed Lifetime original film since Wendy Williams: The Movie (2021).

Plot
Monica, a Houston-based television host, is experiencing turmoil in personal life when she is assigned an enthusiastic new assistant, Simone, who looks just like her.

Cast
 Amber Riley as Simone
 Raven Goodwin as Monica Harris
 K. Michelle as Bebe, Monica's best friend
 Janet Hubert as Denise, Monica's mother
 Devale Ellis as Eric
 Kron Moore as Clarke Michelle

Production
On October 29, 2021, it was announced that Lifetime ordered Single Black Female written by Sa'Rah Jones and Tessa Evelyn Scott with director Shari L. Carpenter. The film's story is inspired by the 1992 film Single White Female starring Bridget Fonda and Jennifer Jason Leigh.

Amber Riley and Raven Goodwin were approached to star as co-leads in part because they are frequently mistaken for each other. The film was shot in Atlanta, Georgia.

Release
Single Black Female premiered on Lifetime on February 5, 2022.

The film was watched by 5.1 million viewers on-air and online and was the most-watched original movie of the year across all telecasts.

References

External links
 
 

2022 television films
2022 thriller films
African-American films
American thriller television films
Films about stalking
Films set in Houston
Films shot in Atlanta
Lifetime (TV network) films
2022 films
2020s American films